"The One with Ross's monkey Song" is the seventh episode of Friends ninth season. It first aired on the NBC network in the United States on November 14, 2004.

Plot
While changing Emma, Ross starts to sing Sir Mix-a-Lot's "Baby Got Back", which makes Emma laugh for the first time. Rachel is very jealous to find out that she missed Emma's first laugh, and is not amused to find that Ross was singing a song about "a guy who likes to have sex with women with giant asses" to their baby daughter, even though Ross tries to point out that the song "promotes a healthy...body image." Rachel tries many different things to get Emma to laugh, but she realizes that only "Baby Got Back" will cause Emma to laugh. At the end of the episode, Ross and Rachel sing a duet of the song and even do some dancing along with it, unaware that the rest of the group is watching them do it.

Phoebe is very concerned about meeting Mike's parents for dinner at their home. As they talk about it, Rachel talks about meeting Ross's parents for the first time during which she reveals that Judy said that Rachel was like the daughter she never had, which upsets Monica. With some fashion and conversation tips from Monica and Rachel, Phoebe arrives at the Hannigans wearing a very traditional and conservative outfit that prompts Mike to tell Phoebe that she looks like his mother. Phoebe also begins speaking in a very "snobbish" or aristocratic accent in an effort to fit in with Mike's rich parents. Mike encourages her to just be herself, but that produces disastrous results as Phoebe provides details about her life on the street (including the fact that a pimp once spat in her mouth), playfully punches Mr. Hannigan in the chest (unaware that he just had surgery), and provides Mrs. Hannigan with far too much information about Mike's sexual behavior. Phoebe is so desperate to fit in that she even tries to eat veal despite being a fervent vegetarian. While she is in the bathroom throwing up, Mike's parents drop some not-so-subtle hints about breaking up with Phoebe. Phoebe overhears Mike defending her and telling his parents that he loves Phoebe. Phoebe runs in and tells Mike that she loves him, too. Mike and Phoebe leave, but not before Phoebe tells the Hannigans that she threw up in the coat closet instead of the bathroom.

When Joey asks Monica and Chandler how he should invest his money (as opposed to his current system of taping it to the back of his toilet tank), Monica suggests investing in real estate and even tells Joey that her old boyfriend, Richard Burke, is moving out of his apartment. Chandler, who still dislikes and distrusts Richard, tags along with Joey to check out Richard's old apartment. While there, Chandler sees a videotape with Monica's name on it; he quickly (and Joey slowly) concludes that it is a sex tape. Chandler steals the tape and tries to watch it at home, but is too afraid of what might be on there and instead asks Joey to watch it. At first, it just is a football game, but it quickly switches over to a sex tape. Joey manages to tackle Chandler before he sees too much and tackles Monica when she walks into the room. An insecure Chandler tells Monica that all he can think about is her rolling around in bed with Richard while wearing cowboy boots, but Monica responds that she has never worn cowboy boots. They watch more of the tape and see that, in fact, it is not Monica, which makes Chandler relieved. However, Monica is rather miffed that Richard taped over her.

Reception
Purple Clover picked it as one of the 20 funniest episodes of Friends. Digital Spy ranked the episode #13 on their ranking of the 236 Friends episodes. BuzzFeed ranked "The One with Ross's Inappropriate Song" #49 on their list of the 53 most iconic Friends episodes. Telegraph & Argus ranked it #67 on their ranking of the 236 Friends episodes.

References

2002 American television episodes
Friends (season 9) episodes